Vila Verde de Ficalho is a civil parish in the municipality of Serpa, Portugal. It is one of the main crossings on the Portugal–Spain border.

References

Freguesias of Serpa
Portugal–Spain border crossings